Epsilon Equulei, Latinized from ε Equulei, is a star system of apparent magnitude +5.23 in the constellation of Equuleus. It is located 180 light years away from the Solar System, based on its parallax.

Star system 
Two stars make up the brighter part of the Epsilon Equulei star system. They are called Epsilon Equulei A and B and are main-sequence stars of spectral type of F5 and F6, respectively. The orbital period of this binary is about 101.5 years. The two stars passed their periastron in 1920. Finally, it is thought that Epsilon Equulei A may be, in turn, a spectroscopic binary. The orbital period of the latter would be 2.03133 days.

Approximately 10 arcseconds away from A and B is Epsilon Equulei C (HIP 103571), with an apparent magnitude of 7.35. It is another F-type main-sequence stars, and based on its similar distance and proper motion to A and B, it is assumed to be associated.

The Epsilon Equulei system is thought to be approximately 1.5 billion years old.

References

Equuleus
Triple star systems
Equulei, 01
Equulei, Epsilon
F-type main-sequence stars
Durchmusterung objects
103569
199766
8034